Harald Jockusch (born 1939 in Frankfurt am Main) is a German biologist and artist with the alias Hal Jos.

Scientific career

Scientific education as biologist
Jockusch studied biology and chemistry in Frankfurt am Main, Tübingen and Munich. He  did his thesis work  at the Max Planck Institute for Biology in Tübingen  in the group  headed by Georg Melchers and finished 1966 with the doctoral thesis: Temperatursensitive Mutanten des Tabakmosaikvirus (Temperature sensitive mutants of tobacco mosaic virus) and an examination (rigorosum) at the University of Tübingen in genetics, microbiology and organic chemistry. As a student and doctoral candidate Jockusch was a freelance scientific journalist for the daily newspaper Frankfurter Allgemeine Zeitung  and the weekly DIE ZEIT). As a postdoc he worked at the University of Wisconsin, Madison. 1971 he qualified as a lecturer in biology  at the University of Tübingen . Between 1974 and 1977 Jockusch worked as an assistant professor at the Biozentrum  of the University of Basel, Switzerland. From 1977 to 1981 he was a professor for neurobiology at the University of Heidelberg. From 1981 to 2004 he held   the chair  for Developmental Biology and Molecular Pathology at the University of Bielefeld. There he was vice-rector for research and young scientists from 1988 to 1991. Harald Jockusch is married to the cell biologist Brigitte M. Jockusch.

Scientific focus
Harald Jockusch has worked in different fields of biology but a recurring theme is the use of mutations and model systems to analyse the role of proteins in development, morphogenesis, and disease, including:

Host-plant virus interactions; host defence; genetic control of development and pathology of the neuromuscular system: mouse models for human genetic diseases
Ion channels, cytoskeleton and cell-matrix interactions in muscle and in the neuromuscular system; neurodegeneration
Pathogenesis by misfolded proteins in plant and animal cells
Gene mapping and comparative genomics in vertebrates
Topography of tissue formation in the mammalian embryo
Topological and dynamic modelling
Family names and the German language

Scientific contributions

RNA viruses
During the analysis of the host defence discovery of temperature sensitive (ts) ts TMV coat proteins of tobacco mosaic virus (TMV)

Relationship between the structural stability and amino acid replacements of mutant TMV coat proteins (collaboration with H.-G. Wittmann and Brigitte Wittmann-Liebold)

More recent work: ts TMV coat proteins as models for misfolded (toxic) proteins in the host plant cell and in transfected animal cells

Synthesis of active phage Q beta replicase in a cell-free system

Developmental biology and molecular pathology

A mouse mutant, the so-called ADR mouse, was characterized as genetic model for human myotonia type Becker. As in the human Becker and Thomsen myotonias, a strongly reduced chloride conductance of the muscle fibre membrane causes hyperexcitability of the muscle fibre, leading to episodic stiffness. In the ADR mouse the mutated gene was identified as coding for the then newly discovered muscular chloride channel (in collaboration with the group of Thomas Jentsch). These results lead to the identification of the human myotonia gene mutations in which either cause recessive Becker or dominant Thomsen myotonia depending on the change in the amino acid sequence.

Biomechanical analyses of the consequence of the deficiencies in the cytoskeletal proteins dystrophin (the protein deficient in Duchenne muscular dystrophy) and desmin in isolated muscle fibres and muscle cell cultures

Biochemical investigations into the neurodegeneration using the wobbler mouse model for ALS. The responsible gene was identified as Vps54, a gene involved in protein sorting during the retrograde vesicle transport within the cell (in collaboration with the group of Miriam Meisler, Ann Arbor)

Discovery of a feedback mechanism between the extracellular protease ADAM 8 and the inflammation signalling molecule tumour necrosis factor alpha (TNFalpha) (with Jörg-Walter Bartsch)

Proteomics of tissues affected by hereditary neuromuscular diseases in the mouse model; analysis of the testis in the wobbler ALS mouse model

Morphogenesis of cardiac and skeletal muscle and of the pancreas

Theoretical models
Topology of the metazoan body plan

Dynamics of frequency of family names after imposing the rule "rare wins"

Artistic career

The later artist Hal Jos started with cartoons before he could read and write. As an older child he painted animals in their natural environment and as a youth became interested in applied graphics. In recent years he uses metals, bones and other materials besides acrylic paint for collages and "semicollages". He took part in exhibitions in Kunsthalle Tübingen and Kunsthalle Basel and in Sofia (Bulgaria); he had several individual exhibitions in Bielefeld (Center for Interdisciplinary Studies 2004, University 2012), Freiburg 2008 ("You are welcome – Mad City 1968-1970", Carl Schurz Haus) and in a number of galleries in Southern Germany. From 1971 to 1974 he was a member of the Artists Association Tübingen.

See also
 List of publications during Jockusch's time as professor at the University of Bielefeld (1981–today)
 Jockusch H Publications in Pubmed
 Biomed Experts
 ResearchGate
 Hal Jos
 Hal Jos Art
 Hal Jos Portfolio
 Hal Jos Mygall

References

20th-century German biologists
20th-century German botanists
Botanists active in Europe
1939 births
Living people
German geneticists